Ammi may refer to:

 Ammi (plant), a plant genus in the family Apiaceae
 Ahmed Ammi (born 1981), Moroccan footballer
 Ammi Hondo (born 1997), Japanese para-alpine skier
 Rabbi Ammi, a sage mentioned in the Mishnah and Talmud
 1-Aminomethyl-5-methoxyindane, a drug
 Association of Medical Microbiology and Infectious Disease Canada, known as AMMI Canada

See also 
  includes persons with the forename

 Ami (disambiguation)
 Amy (disambiguation)
 Amie (disambiguation)